The tepui whitestart or tepui redstart (Myioborus castaneocapilla) is a species of bird in the family Parulidae.
It is found in humid highland forest, woodland and scrub in the tepuis in southern Venezuela, western Guyana and northern Brazil. It is sometimes included as a subspecies of the brown-capped whitestart.

References

tepui whitestart
Birds of the Tepuis
tepui whitestart
Taxonomy articles created by Polbot